He and She may refer to:

He and She (album), by Wynton Marsalis
He & She, American sitcom
L'assoluto naturale, Italian film internationally released as He and She
He and She (play), a 1920 play by Rachel Crothers

See also
He-she, or shemale
She/he, the gender-independent third person pronoun, in couplet form
She and He (1963 film), a Japanese film
She & Him, an American musical duo
Him & Her, a British television show
Her & Him, an adult film
His and Hers (disambiguation)
He, She and It, 1991 novel
She (disambiguation)
He (disambiguation)